Vold Station was a railway station on the Nordland Line in the municipality of Stjørdal in Trøndelag county, Norway. The station was located in Voll, just southeast of the village of Skatval.  It opened in 1938. In 1959, the station was moved  southwards. The station was closed on 27 May 1990.

References

Railway stations in Stjørdal
Railway stations on the Nordland Line
Railway stations opened in 1938
Railway stations closed in 1990
1938 establishments in Norway